Kuzupınarı can refer to:

 Kuzupınarı, Göle
 Kuzupınarı, Yenice
 Kuzupınarı, Yumurtalık